{{Infobox figure skater
|name= Chelsea Liu
|image= Liu&Johnson.IMG 5873.JPG
|imagesize=
|caption= Liu and Johnson in March 2015
|fullname=
|altname= Liu Jiaxi (刘家希)
|country= 
|formercountry= 
|birth_date= 
|birth_place= Marshall, Missouri
|hometown=
|residence= Irvine, California
|height= 
|partner= '|formerpartner= Danny O'Shea  Xie Zhong  Ian Meyh  Brian Johnson  Devin Perini
|coach= Todd Sand  Jenni Meno
|formercoach=
|choreographer= Adam Rippon
|formerchoreographer= Renée Roca  Pasquale Camerlengo
|skating club= Saint Paul FSC
|former skating club=
|currenttraininglocations= Irvine, California
|formertraininglocations= Aliso Viejo, California  Lake Forest, California
|beganskating= 2006
|retired=
|combined total= 181.40
|combined date= 2017 U.S. Classic
|SP score= 62.55
|SP date= 2021 CS Warsaw Cup
|FS score= 119.94
|FS date= 2017 U.S. Classic
}}Chelsea Liu''' (born December 31, 1999) is an American pair skater. With her former skating partner, Brian Johnson, she won two medals on the ISU Challenger Series. They also competed together at one ISU Junior Grand Prix Final and two World Junior Championships.

With former partner Xie Zhong for China, Liu is the 2020 Chinese national bronze medalist.

 Personal life 
Chelsea Liu was born December 31, 1999, in Marshall, Missouri. The daughter of Tingyuan Liu and Koman Ting, she has an older sister, Chaochih, who competed for Chinese Taipei, and a younger sister, Cheyenne.

 Career 
 Early years 
Liu began skating in 2006. She teamed up with Devin Perini in July 2010. They debuted on the ISU Junior Grand Prix (JGP) series in 2013, placing fifth at both of their assignments, before winning the junior silver medal at the 2014 U.S. Championships.

 Partnership with Johnson 
Liu teamed up with Brian Johnson in May 2014. They were coached by Todd Sand and Jenni Meno in Orange County, California.

During the 2014–15 JGP series, Liu/Johnson won a bronze medal in Dresden, Germany and placed fourth in Zagreb, Croatia. Their results gave them a spot at the 2014–15 JGP Final in Barcelona, Spain, where the pair finished sixth. After winning the junior silver medal at the 2015 U.S. Championships, they were assigned to the 2015 World Junior Championships in Tallinn, Estonia. The pair placed 5th in the short program, 8th in the free skate, and 7th overall.

Competing in the 2015–16 JGP series, Liu/Johnson placed 8th in Linz, Austria and 5th in Toruń, Poland. Ranked fifth in both segments, the pair finished fifth at the 2016 World Junior Championships in Debrecen, Hungary.

 Partnership with O'Shea 
On June 29, 2021, NBC Sports published an article announcing new partnership with Danny O'Shea .

 Programs 

 With O'Shea 

 With Meyh 

 With Johnson 

 With Perini 

 Competitive highlights GP: Grand Prix; CS: Challenger Series; JGP: Junior Grand Prix''

With O'Shea for the United States

With Zhong for China

With Meyh for the United States

With Johnson for the United States

With Perini for the United States

Detailed results

With O'Shea

References

External links 

 
 
 
 

1999 births
American female pair skaters
American sportspeople of Taiwanese descent
American sportswomen of Chinese descent
Living people
People from Marshall, Missouri
Sportspeople from Irvine, California
21st-century American women